Catedral de Nossa Senhora do Paraíso is a church located in São Paulo, Brazil and is the seat of the Melkite Greek Catholic Eparchy of Nossa Senhora do Paraíso em São Paulo. The temple is located in the neighborhood of Paradise in the city of São Paulo and was constructed in 1952.

This church became bishop's see on November 29, 1971, after being transferred from Saint Basil Church (Rio de Janeiro).

References

External links
 https://web.archive.org/web/20141222024305/http://www.pastoralis.com.br/pastoralis/html/modules/newbb/print.php?form=1&topic_id=909&forum=15&order=DESC&start=0

Arab Brazilian
Eastern Catholic cathedrals in Brazil
Melkite Greek Catholic Church in Brazil
Melkite Greek Catholic cathedrals
Cathedrals in São Paulo
Churches completed in 1952
20th-century Roman Catholic church buildings in Brazil
20th-century Eastern Orthodox church buildings